Amélie Mauresmo was the defending champion but withdrew from her semifinal match against Lindsay Davenport.

Martina Hingis won in the final 6–3, 4–6, 7–5 against Davenport.

Seeds
A champion seed is indicated in bold text while text in italics indicates the round in which that seed was eliminated. The top four seeds received a bye to the second round.

  Martina Hingis (champion)
  Lindsay Davenport (final)
  Monica Seles (quarterfinals)
  Conchita Martínez (semifinals)
  Serena Williams (quarterfinals)
  Anna Kournikova (second round)
  Amanda Coetzer (second round)
  Jennifer Capriati (second round)

Draw

Final

Top half

Bottom half

Qualifying

Seeds

  Nadia Petrova (Qualifier)
 n/a
  Brie Rippner (Qualifier)
  Tina Pisnik (Qualifier)
  Maria Elena Camerin (first round)
  Alexandra Stevenson (first round)
  Cristina Torrens Valero (first round)
 n/a

Qualifiers

  Nadia Petrova
  Elena Bovina
  Brie Rippner
  Tina Pisnik

Draw

First qualifier

Second qualifier

Third qualifier

Fourth qualifier

External links
 Main and Qualifying draws

Women's Singles
2001 WTA Tour